Saguna is a census town in the Kalyani community Development Block in the Kalyani subdivision of the Nadia district in the state of West Bengal, India.

Geography

Location

According to the map of Kalyani Block Consists of 7 Gram Panchayat's, viz. Saguna, Madanpur - 1, Madanpur - 2, Chanduria - 2, Simurali, Kanchrapara, Sarati

Saguna Panchayat falls funder Kalyani police station under Ranaghat Police District.

Saguna is a village that is shaped with road and fields.

Area overview
Nadia district is part of the large alluvial plain formed by the Ganges-Bhagirathi system. The Kalyani subdivision has the Bhagirathi/ Hooghly on the west. Topographically, Kalyani subdivision is a part of the Ranaghat-Chakdaha Plain, the low-lying area found in the south-eastern part of the district. The smallest subdivision in the district, area-wise, has the highest level of urbanisation in the district. 76.73% of the population lives in urban areas and 23.27% lives in the rural areas.

Note: The map alongside presents some of the notable locations in the subdivision. All places marked in the map are linked in the larger full screen map. All the four subdivisions are presented with maps on the same scale – the size of the maps vary as per the area of the subdivision.

Demographics
According to the 2011 Census of India, Saguna had a total population of 14,995, of which 7,717 (51%) were males and 7,274 (49%) were females. Population in the age range 0–6 years was 1,266. The total number of literate persons in Saguna was 11,933 (86.92% of the population over 6 years). There is also a ongoing increase in the population of this area as the newly built All India Institute of Medical Sciences, Kalyani is built at Basantapur village in the Saguna Panchayat in Kalyani built recently.

Infrastructure
According to the District Census Handbook 2011, Nadia, Saguna covered an area of 4.9858 km2. Among the civic amenities, the protected water supply involved overhead tank, tubewell/ borewell, hand pump. It had 1,389 domestic electric connections. Among the medical facilities it had 1 medicine shop. Among the educational facilities it had 8 primary schools, 1 senior secondary school. It had the branch offices of 1 nationalised bank and 1 cooperative bank.

There is also a All India Institute of Medical Sciences, Kalyani (AIIMS Kalyani) at Basantapur village in the Saguna Panchayat in Kalyani built recently.

Transport
Madanpur railway station & Kalyani railway station located nearby, is situated on the Sealdah-Ranaghat Line of the Kolkata Suburban Railway. Auto-Rickshaws are available for transport as well as Toto Rickshaws.

References

Cities and towns in Nadia district